Why Men Fight (Why Men Fight: a method of abolishing the international duel) is a 1916 book by mathematician and philosopher Bertrand Russell. Printed in 1917 in response to the devastations of WWI in New York by The Century Co.

The work was republished with the title Principles of Social Reconstruction.

Contents 
The book is composed of eight chapters.

 The Principles of Growth
 The State
 War as an Institution.
 Property
 Education
 Marriage and the population question
 Religion and Churches
 What we can do

References 

Books by Bertrand Russell
1917 non-fiction books
The Century Company books